The 2018–19 season is Albacete Balompié's 78th season in existence and the club's second consecutive season in the second division of Spanish football. In addition to the domestic league, Albacete participated in this season's edition of the Copa del Rey. The season covered the period from 1 July 2018 to 30 June 2019.

Players

Current squad

Reserve team

Out on loan

Transfers

In

Out

Pre-season and friendlies

Competitions

Overview

Segunda División

League table

Results summary

Results by round

Matches
The fixtures were revealed on 24 July 2018.

Copa del Rey

References

External links

Albacete Balompié seasons
Albacete Balompié